Marvin Schwäbe (born 25 April 1995) is a German professional footballer who plays as a goalkeeper for Bundesliga club 1. FC Köln.

He came to Cologne from Brøndby for the 2021 season. Before that, he had been with Hoffenheim, but mainly on loan to other German clubs.  He has been capped by Germany at youth level.

Club career

Early career
A goalkeeper, Schwäbe started his career at local club SC Hassia Dieburg before moving to Kickers Offenbach. In 2009, he was picked up by Eintracht Frankfurt. On 5 October 2012, while still an active part of the youth team, he made his first call-up for the second team in the 3–1 loss to Wormatia Worms in the Regionalliga Südwest.

Hoffenheim
In 2013, Schwäbe was signed by Hoffenheim and played for their second team the following season, also in the Regionalliga Südwest while playing for the club's under-19 side. With the latter he won the German Under 19 championship. For the 2014–15 Bundesliga season, he was promoted to the first team while still making appearances for the second team.

Schwäbe joined 3. Liga club Osnabrück on loan for the 2015–16 season. On 25 July 2015, he made his 3. Liga debut in the 0–0 match against Erzgebirge Aue.

In the 2016–17 season, Schwäbe was loaned out once again, this time to 2. Bundesliga club Dynamo Dresden. On 6 August 2016, he made his 2. Bundesliga debut in the 1–1 match against 1. FC Nürnberg. On 19 May 2017, the loan was extended for one season more.

Brøndby
After the 2017–18 season, Schwäbe returned to Hoffenheim, where he was signed by Danish Superliga side Brøndby as a replacement for Frederik Rønnow who had in turn been signed by Eintracht Frankfurt. Schwäbe signed a three-year deal with the club. At Brøndby, he grew out to become the undisputed starter in goal, both under fellow German Alexander Zorniger, and later under head coach Niels Frederiksen. During his stint in Denmark, he was rumoured to return to German football multiple times, included interest from Stuttgart in 2019 and 2020, but a move did not materialise both times.

On 1 June 2021 Schwäbe confirmed, that he would leave Brøndby at the end of his contract on 30 June 2021.

1. FC Köln
On 1 July 2021, it was reported that Schwäbe had joined Bundesliga side 1. FC Köln on a free transfer to become the backup to starting goalkeeper Timo Horn. He made his debut on 8 August in the DFB-Pokal match against Carl Zeiss Jena, where his team won after a penalty-shootout. He became the starting goalkeeper for Köln in the 2021–22 season.

Career statistics

Club

Honours
Brøndby
Danish Superliga: 2020–21

Germany
 UEFA European Under-21 Championship: 2017
Individual

 kicker Bundesliga Team of the Season: 2021–22

References

External links

German footballers
1995 births
Living people
Association football goalkeepers
Germany under-21 international footballers
German expatriate footballers
People from Dieburg
Sportspeople from Darmstadt (region)
Footballers from Hesse
Eintracht Frankfurt II players
TSG 1899 Hoffenheim II players
VfL Osnabrück players
Dynamo Dresden players
Brøndby IF players
1. FC Köln players
2. Bundesliga players
3. Liga players
Danish Superliga players
Expatriate men's footballers in Denmark
German expatriate sportspeople in Denmark